Erik Lesser (born 17 May 1988) is a German former biathlete. In 2010, he ran his first single World Cup Race. At the 2014 Winter Olympics in Sochi, he won a silver medal at Men's individual. At the Biathlon World Championships 2013 he won a bronze medal with the German team in Men's relay.

His grandfather Axel Lesser competed in cross-country skiing for East Germany at the 1976 Winter Olympics.

Career
Erik Lesser, grandson of Axel Lesser, lives in Zella-Mehlis and trained mainly in Oberhof. His coach is Mark Kirchner, before Peter Sendel. Lesser began cross-country skiing at the age of six and took up biathlon in 1999 at the age of eleven. A graduate of the Sports Gymnasium Oberhof, he started his competitive career with the club SV Eintracht Frankenhain.

In 2008 he started in Ruhpolding at his first Junior World Championship, where he was seventh in the individual, 16th in the sprint, and eighth in the pursuit. A year later, he won in Canmore a bronze medal in the individual competition, finished eleventh in sprint and pursuit, and took the first leg in the men's relay, where together with Simon Schempp, Benedikt Doll and Florian Graf he took a gold medal. In the summer, he won the Junior Summer World Championships in Oberhof, taking the sprint and pursuit titles on roller skis.

In his World Cup debut in Kontiolahti on 12 March 2010, Lesser finished second in the German mixed relay with Kati Wilhelm, Magdalena Neuner and Simon Schempp. In his debut in solo competition, he finished 44th in the sprint, qualifying him for the subsequent pursuit, where he finished 51st. In 2011, he improved his performance, and at Holmenkollen in Oslo, he finished 24th in the pursuit and 40th in the sprint. At the first race of the 2013 in Östersund, Lesser stood for the first time on the World Cup podium. He finished third in the individual, achieving a clear shoot.

In the 2014 Winter Olympics in Sochi, Erik Lesser won silver medals in the individual competition and with the German men's relay squad. On the final day of the Games, he also participated in the 50km cross-country freestyle race and finished 42nd among 64 starters.

In the 2015 World Championships, Erik Lesser finished fifth in the sprint race. In the ensuing pursuit, he won the gold medal and thus also celebrated his first World Cup victory. With the season's victory in the World Cup, Lesser was a double world champion.

Erik Lesser ended his career on March 20, 2022, with the races at Holmenkollen.

Biathlon results
All results are sourced from the International Biathlon Union.

Olympic Games
3 medals (2 silver, 1 bronze)

*The mixed relay was added as an event in 2014.

World Championships
7 medals (2 gold, 3 silver, 2 bronze)

*During Olympic seasons competitions are only held for those events not included in the Olympic program.
**The single mixed relay was added as an event in 2019.

World Cup Highlights
2010, Kontiolahti,  2nd in mixed relay (with Wilhelm / Neuner / Schempp)
2012, Östersund,  3rd in individual
2013, Oberhof,  3rd in team relay (with Schempp / Peiffer / Graf)
2013, Holmenkollen,  3rd in mass start
2013, Sochi,  2nd in team relay (with Birnbacher / Peiffer / Doll)
2013, Annecy,  2nd in pursuit
2013, Annecy,  2nd in team relay (with Birnbacher / Peiffer / Schempp)
2014, Ruhpolding,  2nd in team relay (with Stephan / Birnbacher / Schempp)
2014, Antholz,  3rd in team relay (with Birnbacher / Peiffer / Schempp)
2015, Ruhpolding,  2nd in team relay (with Birnbacher / Peiffer / Schempp)
2015, Antholz,  2nd in team relay (with Boehm / Peiffer / Schempp)
2015, Holmenkollen,  2nd in team relay (with Birnbacher / Peiffer / Schempp)
2016, Ruhpolding,  1st in mass start
2022, Kontiolahti,  2nd in pursuit
2022, Holmenkollen,  1st in pursuit

References

External links
 
 
 
 
 

1988 births
Living people
German male biathletes
Biathlon World Championships medalists
Biathletes at the 2014 Winter Olympics
Biathletes at the 2018 Winter Olympics
Biathletes at the 2022 Winter Olympics
Olympic biathletes of Germany
Olympic silver medalists for Germany
Olympic bronze medalists for Germany
Medalists at the 2014 Winter Olympics
Medalists at the 2018 Winter Olympics
Olympic medalists in biathlon
Cross-country skiers at the 2014 Winter Olympics
Olympic cross-country skiers of Germany
German male cross-country skiers
People from Suhl
Sportspeople from Thuringia
21st-century German people